Abu Ali Muhammad ibn Ali ibn Muqla (885/6 – 20 July 940/1), commonly known as Ibn Muqla, was an official of the Abbasid Caliphate of Persian origin who rose to high state posts in the early 10th century. His career culminated in his own assumption of the vizierate at Baghdad thrice: in 928–930, 932–933 and 934–936. Unable to successfully challenge the growing power of regional emirs, he lost his position to the first amir al-umara, Ibn Ra'iq, and died in prison. He was also a noted calligrapher, inventing al-khatt al-mansūb and khatt ath-thuluth.

Life

Early life and career
Ibn Muqla was born in Baghdad, the capital of the Abbasid Caliphate, in AH 272 (885/6 CE). His career in public service began in Fars, where he served as tax collector. His rise to power in the central government came in 908, under the patronage of the powerful vizier Abu 'l-Hasan Ali ibn al-Furat, who appointed him in charge of official dispatches. It was at this time, under the ineffectual rule of Caliph al-Muqtadir, that the civil bureaucracy reached its apex of power in the Abbasid court, but where the achievements of previous reigns in restoring the Caliphate's fortunes collapsed due to chronic financial shortages. Throughout the period, the political scene in Baghdad was dominated by Ibn al-Furat and his faction (the Banu'l-Furat), his rival Ali ibn Isa al-Jarrah and the faction gathered around him (the Banu'l-Jarrah), and the powerful chief of the military, Mu'nis al-Khadim.  Despite his close ties to Ibn al-Furat, which were re-affirmed during the latter's second tenure in 917–918, Ibn Muqla eventually turned against him. His next promotion came during the de facto 918–928 vizierate of Ali ibn Isa, when he assumed the important department (diwan) of the public estates.

First vizierate
By cultivating the friendship of the powerful chamberlain (hadjib) Nasr, Ibn Muqla managed to secure the post of vizier for himself after Ali's disgrace in 928. His vizierate however was marked by extreme internal instability, including a short-lived coup in 929, instigated by Mu'nis, which deposed al-Muqtadir in favour of his brother al-Qahir. Despite the coup's failure, Mu'nis and his close ally Ali ibn Isa now dominated the government, and led to Ibn Muqla's dismissal in 930.

Second vizierate and the overthrow of al-Qahir

Ibn Muqla was reappointed as vizier by al-Qahir when he succeeded al-Muqtadir after the latter's death in 932. The new caliph's attempts to assert his own authority met with opposition both from Ibn Muqla and from Mu'nis. Mu'nis started conspiring against al-Qahir, but he was arrested and killed before he could act, whereupon, after only six months in office, Ibn Muqla was dismissed. Ibn Muqla then headed another conspiracy, and in 934 al-Qahir was captured, blinded and deposed by the Baghdad troops, with his nephew al-Radi succeeding him.

Third vizierate and downfall
Initially, al-Radi sent for Ali ibn Isa to once more assume the vizierate, but the latter refused on account of his advanced age; Ibn Muqla was then appointed to his third term of office. However, for the first months of the reign, Muhammad ibn Yaqut continued to be the most powerful member of the court until his downfall in April 935; only then did Ibn Muqla truly gain control of the administration.

By this time, the greatest threat faced by the Caliphate was the increasing independence of the regional governors, who had taken advantage of the internal quarrels in the Abbasid court to strengthen their own control over their provinces and withheld the taxes due to Baghdad, leaving the central government crippled. Ibn Muqla resolved to reassert his control over the neighbouring provinces by military force, and chose the Hamdanid-controlled Jazira as his first target: in 935 he launched a campaign that took the Hamdanid capital, Mosul, but he was forced to return to Baghdad. Another attempt in 936 to launch a campaign against the rebellious governor of Wasit, Muhammad ibn Ra'iq, failed to even get started. Coupled with his failure to counter the mounting financial crisis, this last disaster led to Ibn Muqla's dismissal and arrest.

Ibn Muqla's dismissal marks also the final end of the independence of the Abbasid caliphs, for shortly after Ibn Ra'iq was appointed to the new post of amir al-umara ("commander of commanders"), a military-based office that became the de facto ruler of what remained of the Caliphate and deprived the caliph from all real authority. Ibn Ra'iq had the possessions of Ibn Muqla and his son confiscated, and Ibn Muqla in turn began to conspire against the amir al-umara. Ibn Ra'iq however became aware of this, and had him imprisoned and his right hand cut off. Shortly after, even while the army of the Turkish general Bajkam was approaching Baghdad to depose Ibn Ra'iq, his tongue was cut. Despite Bajkam's success, Ibn Muqla remained in prison, where he died on 20 July 940.

Calligraphy 
Ibn Muqla was also famous as a calligrapher and the inventor of the thuluth style. In addition to thuluth, he invented five other styles of calligraphy, including naskh, a smooth cursive script that eventually superseded kūfi as the primary script for transmitting the holy Koran. Naskh is an easy-to-read font and continues to be used in printing to the present era. Ibn Muqla was revered as 'a prophet in the field of handwriting; it was poured upon his hand, even as it was revealed to the bees to make their honey cells hexagonal'. He or his brothers have been considered the originators of the so-called al-khatt al-mansub ("proportioned script") style, perfected by the 11th-century Persian calligrapher Ibn al-Bawwab. "Khatt" refers to the "marking out" of lines, which suggests that calligraphy is a demarcation of space. In the al-khatt al-mansub system letter design is related to three measurements: the size of nuqta; the height of the alif; and the circle with a diameter equal to the height of the alif.

None of Ibn Muqla's authentic work exists today, his work is only known through other sources like Ibn al-Nadim.

See also
 Iraqi art
 Islamic calligraphy
 Persian calligraphy
 List of Persian calligraphers
 List of Iraqi artists

References

Sources
 
 
 
 
 
 
 

880s births
940s deaths
Year of birth uncertain
Year of death uncertain
Calligraphers of Arabic script
Iranian calligraphers
Calligraphers from the Abbasid Caliphate
Viziers of the Abbasid Caliphate
People from Baghdad
Prisoners and detainees of the Abbasid Caliphate
10th-century Iranian politicians
Muslim artists